A transitive dependency is a functional dependency which holds by virtue of transitivity among various software components.

Computer programs
In a computer program a direct dependency is functionality exported by a library, or API, or any software component that is referenced directly by the program itself. 
A transitive dependency is any dependency that is induced by the components that the program references directly.
E.g. a call to a  function will usually induce a transitive dependency to a library that manages the I/O to write the log message in a file.

Dependencies and transitive dependencies can be resolved at different times, depending on how the computer program is assembled and/or executed: e.g. a compiler can have a link phase where the dependencies are resolved. Sometimes the build system even allows management of the transitive dependencies.

Similarly, when a computer uses services, a computer program can depend on a service that should be started before to execute the program. 
A transitive dependency in such case is any other service that the service we depend directly on depends on, e.g. a web browser depends on a Domain Name Resolution service to convert a web URL in an IP address; the DNS will depend on a networking service to access a remote name server.
The Linux boot system  is based on a set of configurations that declare the dependencies of the modules to be started: at boot time  analyzes all the transitive dependencies to decide the execution order of each module to start.

Database Management Systems
Let A, B, and C designate three distinct (but not necessarily disjoint) sets of attributes of a relation.  Suppose all three of the following conditions hold:

 A → B
 It is not the case that B → A
 B → C

Then the functional dependency A → C (which follows from 1 and 3 by the axiom of transitivity) is a transitive dependency.

In database normalization, one of the important features of third normal form is that it excludes certain types of transitive dependencies.  E.F. Codd, the inventor of the relational model, introduced the concepts of transitive dependence and third normal form in 1971.

Example
A transitive dependency occurs in the following relation:

The functional dependency {Book} → {Author nationality} applies; that is, if we know the book, we know the author's nationality.  Furthermore:

 {Book} → {Author}
 {Author} does not → {Book}
 {Author} → {Author nationality}

Therefore {Book} → {Author nationality} is a transitive dependency.

Transitive dependency occurred  because a non-key attribute (Author) was determining another non-key attribute (Author nationality).

Notes

Database constraints
Database theory